Paravur Taluk, is a taluk of Ernakulam District in the Indian State of Kerala. North Paravur is the capital of the taluk. Paravur Taluk lies in the north western part of Ernakulam district bordering Thrissur district. The surrounding taluks are Kochi to the west consisting of Vypin Island, Kodungallur to the north, Chalakudy to the north consisting of Mala, Aluva to the east consisting of Angamaly, Nedumbassery and Aluva, Kanayanur to the south consisting of Cochin City. Paravur is a part of Kochi urban agglomeration area. The western parts of taluk are coastal areas with cultivations like prawn and pokkali rice. The eastern parts are fertile lands. The heavy industries of Kochi is located in Udyogmandal area of the taluk.

History
Parur taluk was prominent in the history of Kerala. Taluk was an attraction to Kochi, Malabar and Travancore Kingdoms. Parur has got its own brands like

 Parur Central Bank (1930) (Amalgamated with Bank Of India - 1990)
 Parur Boat Race
 Parur Market
 Parur Municipality (Old)
 Maliankara
 Parur coir
 Parur court (1875)
 Islands
 Ayroor
 Parur river
 Purapillykavu Bund
 Alengad sugarcane
 Chendamangalam Handloom
 Co operative institutions
 Vedimara Prison
 Parur Jew Street
 The famous place Chendamanglam - Place of paliath Achans. The Paliam Palace, residence of the Paliath Achans, hereditary prime ministers to the former maharajas of Kochi, is one of the architectural splendours of Kerala. The Palace is over 450 years old and houses a collection of historic documents and relics.
 Kunjithai is one of the most famous fishing boat manufacturing place in Kerala with 30 boat yards.

 Once Edappally village was in Parur later added to Kanayannur taluk

Flora and fauna
The land has one of the highest densities of coconut trees. The land also boasts a wide range of other birds and animals. The kingfisher നീലപ്പൊന്മാൻ is common bird in this land and others include black bulbul (depend on the season) brown falcon, crow, woodpecker, sparrow, ravens, pigeons, African fish eagle and cuckoos. The land also has cows, goats, etc.  We can see so many sarpa kavu abode of snakes സർപ്പക്കാവ് near the Hindu Nair homes and temples. They are the best ecology for animals and birds. Fish are abundant in this serene taluk.

Villages
Parur, Ezhikkara, Eloor, Chittatukara, Chendamangalam, Vadakkekara, Kottuvally, Kunnukara, Karumalloor, Varappuzha, Puthenvelikkara, Kadungalloor, Moothakunnam, Alangad. The Block Panchayats are Paravur and Alengad.

Municipalities
 Parur
 Eloor

Parur State warehouse is situated at Vaniakkadu. Parur Block Development Office at Kaitharam. There are lot of Co-Operative banks, Society and Sahakarana Sangams in taluk. The Agricultural Bank is situated at Chennamangalam Jn.

Grama Panchayats and localities
 Alangad
Kongorppilly, Neerikkod, Olanad, Panaikulam, Koduvazhanga, Thiruvalloor
 Chendamangalam
Kurumbathuruth, Kadalvathuruth, Gothurutgothuruthh, Thekkethuruth, Kootukad, Karimbadam, Palathuruth
 Chittatukara
Puthiyakav, Parayakad, Cheriya Pallamthuruth, Alamthuruth, Neendoor, Pattanam, Mannam, Thanipadam
 Ezhikkara
Nandhiattukunnam, Kedamangalam, Palliackal
 Kadungalloor
Eramam, Binanipuram, Muppathadam, Elookara, Kunjunnikkara, Uliyannoor
 Karumalloor
Manjaly, Aduvathuruth, Veliathunad 
 Kottuvally
Kaitharam, Kuttanthuruth, Vaniakad, Valluvally, Thathappilly, Koonammavu 
 Kunnukara
North Kuthiathodu, Ayroor, Kuttippuzha, Chalakka, Thekke Aduvassery, Kunnuvayal
 Puthanvelikkara
Thuruthoor, Manancherykunnu, Elanthikkara, Chathedam, Pazhampillithuruthu, Cherukadapuram, Thelathuruth
 Vadakkekara
Maliankara, Kottuvallikad, Chettikkad, Moothakunnam, Andippillikavu, Vavakad, Paliathuruth, Madaplathuruth, Thuruthippuram, Kunjithai, Muravanthuruth 
 Varappuzha
Puthanpally, Thundathumkadav

Schools
Schools coming under Paravur Sub-educational district
Schools
Samooham High School, Paravur
Sree Narayana Higher Secondary School, Paravur
SNM Higher Secondary School Moothakunnam.
St. Germain's Sion School, Paravur
FMCT HS, Karumallore
Govt. High School, Kadungalloor
Elenthikara HS
Dharmarthadayini Sabha High School, Karimbadam
Christ Raj High School, Kuttippuzha
Islamic school, Mannam, Paravur
K. E. M. High School, Alangad
St. Thomas Higher secondary School, Ayroor
Little Flower High School, Panaikulam
Ansarul Islam School, Manjaly
Govt. High School, Binanipuram
Govt. Lower Primary Boys' School, Kannankulangara where Parur Subdistrict office is situated.
St. George's High School, Puthanpally
Holy Infant Jesus Boys High School
St.Philomena's H.S.S, Koonammavu.
Chavara Darsan CMI Public School, Koonammavu
Kumara Vilasam School, Paravur
Al Madrasathul Islamiya, Vaniakadu

Religious

Temples
 Kannankulangara Sreekrishna Swamy Temple.
 Peruvaram Sivan Temple.
 Mannam Subrahmanya temple (Biggest Kavadi in District)
 Ayroor Sree Durga Bhagavathi-Mahavishnu Temple
 Thiruvaloor Mahadeva temple
 Kadungallur Narasimha swamy temple
 Aduvassery Vasudevapuram temple
 Dakshina Mookambika Temple, Famous for Navarathri festival in which thousands of devotees coming from different parts of Kerala.
 Kottuvallykavu Bhagavathy temple, Kavilnada, Koonammavu.
 Tamil Brahmins Samooha Madam, Kannankulangara, North Paravur.
 Andissery Bhagavthy Temple, Perumpadanna. Undertaken by the S.N.D.P Yogam N. Paravoor
 Villwar vattam Govindapuram Sreekrishna swami Temple, Kottayikovilakam. 3000 years old deity, family temple of Villwar Vattaom kings of Chendamangalam, before Plaiyam time.
 Jayanthamangalam Narasimha swami Temple, Chendamangalam.
 Siva Temple of Chendmangalam.
 Tirumanamkunnil bhagavathi Temple, Vadakkumpuram.
Churches
Kottakkavu Mar Thoma Syro-Malabar Pilgrim Church, North Paravur founded by St. Thomas in A.D. 52
St. Thomas Church, North Paravur where the tomb of Mar Gregorios Abdul Jaleel is situated
 Kunnel Infant Jesus Church, Alangad
 St. Joseph & Mount carmel Roman Catholic Church, Varapuzha Island, ESTD - 1673 November
 St. George Syro-Malabar Catholic Church, (1788 - Constructed - 36 acres in Manampady)- Puthenpally
 St. Sebastian's, Gothuruth
 Ayroor St. Antony's Church
St.Philomena's Forane Church, Koonammavu where the tomb of St.Chavara Kuriakose Elias is situated.
Thuruthur St.Thomas Church

Masjid
Paravur Juma Masjid
Paravur Pattalam Juma Masjid
Manjaly Juma Masjid
Kattenellure Munavarsha Thangal Masjid Tattappilly
Vaniyakkad Juma Masjid
Kadungallur Juma Masjid
Eloor Juma Masjid

State Assembly constituencies
The assembly constituencies are Paravoor and Kalamassery including whole of Paravur Taluk.
Paravur constituency consists of Puthanvelikkara, Vadakkekara, Chendamangalam, Chittatukara, Parur, Ezhikkara, Kottuvally, Varappuzha.
Kalamassery constituency consists of  Kunnukara, Karumalloor, Kadungalloor, Alengad, Eloor, Kalamassery.
Paravur, Kalamassery constituencies belong to Ernakulam Parliamentary constituency.

Pin Code Index for the taluk of Paravur
683102 WestKadungalloor B.O
683108 Uliyannur B.O.
683110 Muppattadam S.O
683501 Udyogamandal
683503 H.M.T. Colony
683504 Kuttikattukara E.D.S.O
683504 Neeleswaram E.D.S.O
683511 Alengad
683511 Karumallur B.O
683511 Neerikkod B.O
683511 Panayikulam B.O
683511 WestVeliyathunadu B.O
683512 ChendamangalamS.O
683513 EzhikkaraB.O
683513 Nanthyattukunnam N.D.B.O
683513 Paravur
683513 Paravur Market N.D.S.O
683513 Paravur Town N.D.S.O
683516 Maliankara B.O
683516 Moothakunnam S.O
683517 Varappuzha Landing B.O
683517 Varappuzha S.O
683518 Koonammavu S.O
683518 Kongorppilly B.O
683519 Kaitharam S.O
683519 Kottuvally B.O
683520 Mannam-Paravur B.O
683521 Vadakkumpuram S.O
683522 Kunjithai B.O
683522 Vadakkekara S.O
683523 Gothuruth E.D.S.O
683524 Kunnukara E.D.S.O
683578 South Aduvassery B.O
683579 Ayroor B.O
683594 Elanthikara B.O.
683594 Kuthiyathodu-Puthanvelikkara P.O
683594 Puthanvelikkara S.O

Nearby villages
These are the villages other than panchayat headquarters.

Panayikulam, Pathalam, Koonammavu, Thuruthipuram, Maliankara, Koottukad, Pattanam, Kottayil Kovilakam, Karingamthuruth, Gothuruth, Parayakad, Vavakkad, Madaplathuruth, Kuriapilly, Kunjithai, Elenthikara, Chathedom, Manjaly.

Government offices
 Sub-District Education Department, Kannankulangara
 First Class Judicial Magistrate Court | Munsif court
 Land Registration Office
 PWD NH Sub Division (NH 66)Office Paravur
 Veterinary Polyclinic
 Homeo clinic, Peruvaram
Taluk Supply Office, N Parur

Notable personalities
 Kuttipuzha Krishna pillai - poet and writer
 Parur T.K. Narayana Pilla - first chief minister of Thirukochi
 M.P.Paul Varappuzha
 Pappan - volleyball player
 Salim kumar - actor
 Paravur bharathan - actor
 Kesari balakrishna pilla - writer and journalist
 Paravur Gorge - writer 
 Kedamangalam Sadanandan
 Justice Narendran

Travel
Distances from Parur

Cities
 Ernakulam (20 km south)
 Thrissur (49 km north east)
 Alapuzha (78 km south)
 Kottayam (84 km south east)
 Palakkad (108 km north east)
 Kozhikode (142 km north)
 Kollam (160 km south)
 Thiruvananthapuram (225 km south)
 Kannur (239 km north)

See also
 Kochi metropolitan area
 Greater Cochin

External links
Taluk from Wikimapia

Geography of Ernakulam district
Taluks of Kerala